Peter W. Haas (born in 1964, in Czechoslovakia), is a Slovak art photographer. He is a member of the International Association of Art. He focuses on analogue photographing and noble techniques like platinotype, bromoil and kallitype. His pieces of art belong to collections of many dignitaries of artistic, political and business sphere in Europe, the USA, Russia and Australia.

Biography 
He was born on 25 June 1964 in Czechoslovakia and he spent his childhood and teenage in Banská Štiavnica where he tried to express himself artistically for the first time. Poetry writing and painting brought him to contacts with photos. He was greatly influenced by academic sculptor Vlado Oravec and his wife. After the Velvet Revolution in 1989 he pursued the carrier of freelance art photographer and he opened two studios in Banská Štiavnica. In 1994 he met professional photographer Leo Redlinger who taught him the product photo and he came to touch with noble prints. His work attracted an interest of diplomatic staff and Peter Haas became an official photographer of several sovereigns and Ambassadors when visiting the Slovak Republic. From 2000 he has been dealing with contact photos and supervised by Dušan Slivka he pursues noble prints.

Art impacts 
Regarding his studies of contact black and white photos and noble print technique like platinotype and bromoil, inclination to pictorialism and functionalism, the main art trends of the past centuries. He was greatly affected by functionalists and pictorialists like Rössler, Drtikol and Sudek, who transformed photography into art.

Independent exhibitions
Israel Gallery of Olechadas 1992 Israel
Gallery Banská Bystrica 1997, Slovakia
Izraeli Cultural Centre Prague 2000, The Czech Republic
Gallery Šalgotarián 2002, Hungary
Gallery Banská Bystrica 2004, Slovakia
Teo Gallery 2006, Banská Bystrica, Slovakia
Gallery Živa, SNG, Rotary Club, Zvolen 2007,Slovakia
Prolaika Gallery 2013 – Bratislava, Slovakia
Zichy's Palace – Gallery – Z – Bratislava, Slovakia - May 2014
Museum SNP - Bratislava, Slovakia - 2014
Gallery Na Tehelnej - Zvolen, Slovakia - 2015

Group exhibitions
Gallery Cosmopolitan, Banska Stiavnica, Slovakia - May 2015 - Vlado Oravec (sculptor) and Peter W. Haas (noble prints)
Gallery "V podkroví", Banska Bystrica, Slovakia - December 2015 - "Winter Romance" Exhibition - artists: Fulla, Galanda, Gwerk, Hloznik, Haas, Kollar etc.

Collections - archive 
The Slovak Mining Museum, Banská Štiavnica, Slovakia
Teo Gallery Banská Bystrica, Slovakia
Over 1000 pieces of work belong to private collections (Slovakia, The Czech Republic, Hungary, Austria, Australia, Israel, France, London, Spain, USA, etc.)

Film 
Portrait of Peter W. Haas (2015) (10-minute film about Haas by Lea Mariassy)
Short display of Haas's artwork
Negative retouching
Exhibition "Metaphor" by Peter Haas

References

External links 
 Gallery - Z
 Alternative photography
 Photoblog about old * techniques and Haas
 En Calaméo
 SOSBB
 Ipernity
 Lotus View camera
 Saatchi Art
 peterwhaas.com
 pteryx

1964 births
Living people
Slovak photographers
Fine art photographers
People from Banská Štiavnica